Francisco Vallejo Pons (born 21 August 1982 in Es Castell, Menorca) is a Spanish chess grandmaster. He is a five-time Spanish Chess Champion.

He achieved the Grandmaster title at the age of 16 years and 9 months. He won the under-18 World Chess Youth Championship in 2000.

He won the Ciudad de Leon Masters after defeating Veselin Topalov 3½–2½.

In 2013 he tied for first at the European Individual Championship.

Notable games 

On 25 February 2006 he defeated FIDE world champion Veselin Topalov in 56 moves with the black pieces at the SuperGM Linares-Morelia chess tournament.

Topalov vs. Vallejo 1.d4  d5  2.c4  c6  3.Nc3  Nf6  4.Nf3  e6  5.Bg5  h6  6.Bh4  dxc4  7.e4  g5  8.Bg3  b5  9.Be2  Bb7  10.0-0  Nbd7  11.Ne5  h5  12.Nxd7  Qxd7  13.Be5  Rh6  14.f3  Qe7  15.a4  a6  16.Qc2  Rd8  17.Rad1  Nd7  18.Bc7  Rc8  19.Bg3  e5  20.d5  b4  21.dxc6  Rhxc6  22.Nd5  Qe6  23.Qd2  h4  24.Bf2 
(diagram 1 )
24... c3  25.bxc3  bxc3  26.Qxg5  c2  27.Rc1  h3  28.g3  Qh6  29.Qf5  Qd2  30.Rfe1  Ba3  31.f4  Bxc1  32.Bh5  Rg6  33.Bxg6  Bxd5  34.exd5 
(diagram 2 )
34... Qxe1+  35.Bxe1  Be3+  36.Kf1  c1=Q  37.Qxf7+  Kd8  38.Ke2  Bb6  39.Bd2  Qc4+  40.Kf3  e4+  41.Kg4  Kc7  42.a5  Bd4  43.Bf5  Rg8+  44.Kh4  Rh8+  45.Kg5  Qb5  46.Be6  e3  47.Be1  e2  48.g4  Rf8  49.Qh7  Be3  50.Kh4  Bxf4  51.g5  Qa4  52.Kh5  Bxh2  53.Bxh3  Be5  54.Qd3  Rh8+  55.Kg6  Nf8+  56.Kf7  Kd8 (diagram 3 )

Retirement and return to chess 
After a painful loss in his penultimate round against Sergey Karjakin in the 2012 Bilbao Chess Masters Final, Vallejo announced his retirement from competitive chess.

Since then he has made multiple appearances in tournaments, for instance in 2014 Bilbao Chess Masters, as well as competed in country leagues.

Vallejo participated in the Grand Prix cycle for 2017–18, after being active in 2016. Having played in the Sharjah and Moscow legs of the event, and finished in the bottom half of the field in both, he had no mathematical chance to qualify for the 2018 Candidates Tournament via the Grand Prix.

References

External links

 
 
 
 
 
 

1982 births
Living people
Chess grandmasters
Spanish chess players
World Youth Chess Champions
Chess Olympiad competitors
Sportspeople from Menorca